The Zee Cine Award Best Music Director is chosen by the jury and the winner is announced at the actual ceremony. A. R. Rahman has won most awards in this category(6 times).

The winners are listed below:-

See also 

 Zee Cine Awards
 Bollywood
 Cinema of India

Zee Cine Awards